The 2011–12 Slovenian Football Cup was the 21st season of the Slovenian Football Cup, Slovenia's football knockout competition. Domžale were the defending champions, having won their first Slovenian Cup the previous season.

Maribor won their seventh cup, beating Celje in the final after penalty shoot-out.

As runners-up of the competition, Celje qualified for the first qualifying round of the 2012–13 UEFA Europa League, since Maribor was already qualified for the 2012–13 UEFA Champions League as Slovenian PrvaLiga champions.

Qualified clubs

2010–11 Slovenian PrvaLiga members
Celje
Domžale
Gorica
Koper
Maribor
Nafta
Olimpija
Rudar
Triglav Kranj
Primorje (dissolved following the 2010–11 season)

Qualified through MNZ Regional Cups
Winners and runners-up of the regional MNZ cups.
MNZ Ljubljana:  Krka, Interblock
MNZ Maribor: Limbuš-Pekre, Malečnik
MNZ Celje: Krško, NK Šentjur
MNZ Koper: Portorož Piran, Ilirska Bistrica
MNZ Nova Gorica: Adria, Tolmin
MNZ Murska Sobota: Veržej, Grad
MNZ Lendava: Hotiza, Odranci
MNZG-Kranj: Šenčur, Britof
MNZ Ptuj: Zavrč, Drava (dissolved following the 2010–11 season)

First round
The matches took place on 23 and 24 August 2011. Adria and NK Šentjur were automatically qualified for the round of 16.

Round of 16
The matches took place on 6 and 14 September 2011. Maribor played their match on 8 October due to Europa League group stage matches.

Quarter-finals
The first legs were played on 18, 19 and 26 October 2011, and the second legs were played on 25 and 26 October and 16 November 2011.

First legs

Second legs

Semi-finals

First legs

Second legs

Final

References

Slovenian Football Cup seasons
Cup
Slovenia